Dr. Ramalinga Reddy is an Indian politician who is the current working president of Karnataka Pradesh Congress Committee from February 2021. He was Minister of State for Home Affairs from 2 September 2017 to 17 May 2018 and Minister of Transport of Karnataka from 18 May 2013 to 2 September 2017.

He contested in the Karnataka 2018 polls and was re-elected from the BTM Layout constituency.

Organizational Activities & Social Service

 Joined Indian National Congress Inspired by the poverty eradication programmes of Late Smt.Indira Gandhi and Late Sri.D.Devaraj Urs.
 Joined NSUI in 1973, attended NSUI National Convention in Trivandrum, Kerala.
 Evinced Interest in organizational activities during student days

References

External links
 Official website

Living people
Politicians from Bangalore
Karnataka MLAs 2008–2013
Karnataka MLAs 2013–2018
Karnataka MLAs 2018–2023
1953 births
Karnataka MLAs 1989–1994
Karnataka MLAs 1994–1999
Karnataka MLAs 1999–2004
Karnataka MLAs 2004–2007